The Bunda people or (also Ambuun, Mbuun) in the Democratic Republic of the Congo are an ethnic group that mostly live in Idiofa Territory, Kwilu District of Bandundu Province. They speak the Mpuono language, spoken by an estimated 165,000 people as of 1972.

Location
The Belgian colonial administration originally gave Idiofa Territory the name of "Babunda Territory" after the Bunda people, who formed the majority of the population.
They are still the most important group in the center of Idiofa territory.
The Bunda are the majority of the population of the administrative center of Idiofa.
There are also Bunda populations in Bulungu Territory and Gungu Territory.

Economy
The Bundu territory has a tropical climate with alternating dry and rainy seasons.
The region has abundant water resources, the most important rivers being the Lubwe, Loange, Kamtsha and the Piopio.
Precipitation in the rainy season is so intense that it is a major obstacle to farming and a time when food may be scarce.
Hunting and fishing are individual activities during this period.
Food is abundant in the dry season, the main season for communal hunting and fishing.

References

Sources

External links

Ethnic groups in the Democratic Republic of the Congo